Negara Daha was a Hindu kingdom successor of Negara Dipa that appears in the Hikayat Banjar. It was located in what is now the Regency of Hulu Sungai Selatan, Province of South Kalimantan, Republic of Indonesia.

Early establishment
Before the formation of the kingdoms in South Kalimantan, the people were still grouped based on the watershed area. After that, a political unit was formed that combined these groups into a kingdom, namely the Kingdom of Negara Dipa. This kingdom was later replaced by the Kingdom of Negara Daha.

Government structure
During the reign of the Kingdom of Negara Daha, the center of government in the South Kalimantan area was located in Muhara Hulak, Nagara.

The Kingdom of Negara Daha also has a trading port in Muara Bahan, Hulu Sungai Selatan Regency.

The original inhabitants of the Daha Kingdom came from the Banjar Masih Tribe.  They inhabit the lower reaches of the Barito and Batang Banyu rivers and speak Banjarese. In addition, there is the occupation of the Banjar Kuala Tribe, the Banjar Pahuluan Tribe, and the Dayak Tribe.

Chronicles of kings and their works
The founder and first king of the Daha State Kingdom was Sekarsungsang. He was given the title Panji Agung Maharaja Sari Kaburangan. Its administrative center is in Muara Hulak and its port is in Muara Bahan. The territory of the State of Daha is the Great Rent, Bunyut, Karasikan, Balitung, Lawai, and Kotawaringin. The last king of the Daha Kingdom was Raden Sukarama. After that the Kingdom of Daha by Raden Samudera. Raden Sukarama's son named Prince Tumenggung, who was against his father's decision and made himself king of the Daha Kingdom. Raden Samudera as heir to the throne finally fled and founded a kingdom in the Banjarmasin region. After that he asked the Demak Sultanate for help to take back its power. Raden Samudera was able to take back his power as king in the Daha Kingdom and establish Banjar kingdom with an Islamic influence.

List of rulers
These are the rulers of Daha named in the Hikayat Banjar. 
 Raden Sekarsungsang(Maharaja Sari Kaburangan)
 Maharaja Sukarama
 Maharaja Mangkubumi
 Maharaja Tumenggung

References

Former countries in Borneo
Medieval Hindu kingdoms
Hindu Buddhist states in Indonesia
Precolonial states of Indonesia